Senator Fink may refer to:

Bill Fink (born 1955), Iowa State Senate
Olaf Fink (1914–1973), Louisiana State Senate